Canyon City, Cañon City, or Canon City may refer to:

Places

Canada
Canyon City, British Columbia, a settlement now named Gitwinksihlkw
Canyon City, Yukon, a ghost town

United States
listed alphabetically by state
Canyon City, Alaska, a campground along the Chilkoot trail
Black Canyon City, Arizona, an unincorporated community in Yavapai County
Canon City, California, a ghost town in Trinity County
Cañon City, Colorado, a home rule municipality in Fremont County
Canyon City, Oregon, a city in Grant County
Canyon City, Texas, originally a town in Comal County that now lies at the bottom of Canyon Lake after the dam was constructed between 1958 to 1964. The town was moved and still exists, (not as a ghost town as a previous entry stated, but as a popular vacation town).
Bryce Canyon City, Utah, a town in Garfield County
Glen Canyon City, Utah, a town in Kane County now known as Big Water

Film
 Canon City, an American crime film from 1948
 Canyon City, an American western from 1943
 Man from Canyon City, a 1965 Spanish-Italian film

Notes

See also
 
 
 
 Cannon City, Minnesota, in Rice County